The McCain Furniture Store Building is a historic commercial building located in downtown Columbia, Missouri.  It was built about 1930 for the S. H. Kress & Co., and remodeled in 1951.  It is a two-story, brick building with a simple stepped parapet.  Though it has hosted a variety of businesses since the closing of the original store, today it holds Plasma Biological Services.

It was listed on the National Register of Historic Places in 2005. It is located in the North Village Arts District.

References

Commercial buildings on the National Register of Historic Places in Missouri
Commercial buildings completed in 1930
Buildings and structures in Columbia, Missouri
National Register of Historic Places in Boone County, Missouri
1930 establishments in Missouri